The 2015 Seguros Bolívar Open Medellín was a professional tennis tournament played on outdoor clay courts. It is the second edition of the tournament for women and twelfth edition for men. It was part of the 2015 ATP Challenger Tour and the 2015 ITF Women's Circuit, offering a total prize money of $50,000+H for both men and for women. It took place in Medellín, Colombia, on 6–12 April 2015 for women and 5–11 October 2015 for men.

Men's singles main draw entrants

Seeds 

 1 Rankings as of 28 September 2015.

Other entrants 
The following players received wildcards into the singles main draw:
  Felipe Escobar
  Daniel Elahi Galán
  Juan Sebastián Gómez
  Felipe Mantilla

The following player received entry into the singles main draw as a special exempt:
  Marcelo Arévalo

The following players received entry from the qualifying draw:
  Christopher Díaz Figueroa 
  Peter Kobelt 
  Fabrício Neis
  Juan Pablo Varillas

The following player received entry as a lucky loser:
  Juan Ignacio Galarza

Women's singles main draw entrants

Seeds 

 1 Rankings as of 23 March 2015

Other entrants 
The following players received wildcards into the singles main draw:
  María Fernanda Herazo 
  Yuliana Lizarazo 
  Yuliana Monroy
  María Paulina Pérez 

The following players received entry from the qualifying draw:
  Martina Caregaro
  Lauren Embree 
  Gaia Sanesi
  Katerina Stewart

Champions

Men's singles

 Paolo Lorenzi  def.  Gonzalo Lama, 7–6(7–3), 2–0 ret.

Women's singles 

 Teliana Pereira def.  Verónica Cepede Royg, 7–6(8–6), 6–1

Men's doubles

 Nicolás Barrientos /  Eduardo Struvay def.  Alejandro Gómez /  Felipe Mantilla, 7–6(8–6), 6–7(4–7), [10–4]

Women's doubles 

  Lourdes Domínguez Lino /  Mandy Minella  def.  Mariana Duque /  Julia Glushko, 7–5, 4–6, [10–5]

External links 
 2015 Seguros Bolívar Open Medellín at ITFtennis.com
  

2015 ITF Women's Circuit
2015
2015
2015 in Colombian tennis
Seguros Bolivar Open Medellin